Frances Sternhagen (born January 13, 1930) is an American actress; she has appeared on- and off-Broadway, in movies, and on TV since the 1950s.

Early life and education
Sternhagen was educated at the Madeira and Potomac schools in McLean, Virginia. At Vassar College, she was elected head of the Drama Club "after silencing a giggling college crowd at a campus dining hall with her interpretation of a scene from Richard II, playing none other than Richard himself". She attended the Catholic University of America as a grad student, where she met Thomas A. Carlin, her future husband, to whom she was married from 1956 until his death in 1991; the couple had six children. She also studied at the Perry Mansfield School of the Theatre, and at New York City's Neighborhood Playhouse.

Stage career
Sternhagen started her career teaching acting, singing, and dancing to school children at the Milton Academy in Massachusetts, and she first performed in 1948 at a Bryn Mawr summer theater in The Glass Menagerie and Angel Street. She went on to work at Washington's Arena Stage from 1953–54, then made her Broadway debut in 1955 as Miss T. Muse in The Skin of Our Teeth. The same year, she had her off-Broadway debut in Thieves' Carnival, and her TV debut in The Great Bank Robbery on Omnibus (CBS). By the following year, she had won her first Obie Award for "Distinguished Performance (Actress)" in The Admirable Bashville (1955–56).

She has won two Tony Awards, for Best Supporting Actress (Dramatic):  in 1974 for the original Broadway production of Neil Simon's The Good Doctor and in 1995 for the revival of The Heiress. She has been nominated for Tony Awards five other times, including for her roles in the original Broadway casts of Equus (1975) and On Golden Pond (1979), as well as for Lorraine Hansberry's The Sign in Sidney Brustein's Window (1972), the musical Angel (1978), which was based on Thomas Wolfe's Look Homeward, Angel, and the 2002 revival of Paul Osborn's Morning's at Seven.

She portrayed the title character in 1988's Pulitzer prize-winning drama Driving Miss Daisy, which was originated by Dana Ivey at Playwrights Horizons in New York. Sternhagen took over the role after the show moved to the John Houseman Theatre and played it for more than two years. Her off-Broadway awards include two nominations for the Drama Desk Award for Outstanding Actress in a Play in 1998, for a revival of Eugene O'Neill's Long Day's Journey into Night (which starred her own son, Paul Carlin, as her character's son, Jamie Tyrone) for the Irish Repertory Theatre and in 2005, for the World War I drama Echoes of the War.

Sternhagen appeared as the Daughter in the original 1971 Broadway production of Edward Albee's All Over with Colleen Dewhurst and Jessica Tandy. In the summer of 2005, she starred in the Broadway production of Steel Magnolias along with Marsha Mason, Delta Burke, Christine Ebersole, Lily Rabe, and Rebecca Gayheart. She also starred in the 2005 revival of Edward Albee's Seascape, produced by Lincoln Center Theater at the Booth Theater on Broadway.

In 2013, Sternhagen was awarded the Obie Award for Lifetime Achievement. She is included in the New Rochelle Walk of Fame.

Film roles
Sternhagen made her film debut in Up the Down Staircase (1967). She has worked periodically in Hollywood since then. She had character roles in Paddy Chayefsky's The Hospital (1971), in Two People (1973), and in Billy Wilder's Fedora (1978). She appeared in Starting Over (1979), opposite Sean Connery in Outland (1981), and in Michael J. Fox's Bright Lights, Big City (1988). 

She played Farrah Fawcett's mother in See You in the Morning (1989), Richard Farnsworth's wife in Misery (1990), Lillian in Doc Hollywood (1991) and John Lithgow's psychiatrist in Raising Cain (1992). Sternhagen starred in Frank Darabont's 2007 science-fiction horror film The Mist. She also appeared in the family films Dolphin Tale (2011) and And So It Goes (2014), her last acting role before retirement.

Television roles

She may be best known to TV audiences as Esther Clavin, mother of John Ratzenberger's Boston postman character Cliff Clavin, on the long-running series Cheers, for which she received two Emmy Award nominations. She also played Millicent Carter on ER; Bunny MacDougal, mother of Trey, Charlotte's first husband on Sex and the City (another Emmy Award nomination); a memorable Willie Rae Johnson (mother of Brenda Leigh Johnson, played by Kyra Sedgwick) on The Closer; and Law & Order, among other network dramas and sitcoms. She worked for many years in soap operas such as Another World, The Secret Storm, Love of Life and played two roles on One Life to Live. She recorded a voice-over for a May 2002 episode of The Simpsons ("The Frying Game"). She is also recognized as Mrs. Marsh from a series of television commercials for Colgate toothpaste that aired in the 1970s.

Filmography

References

External links

 
 
 

1930 births
Living people
American film actresses
American stage actresses
American television actresses
American people of German descent
Drama Desk Award winners
Catholic University of America alumni
Obie Award recipients
Tony Award winners
Vassar College alumni
Madeira School alumni
Actresses from Virginia
Actresses from Washington, D.C.
Actresses from New Rochelle, New York
20th-century American actresses
21st-century American actresses